Genaro Borrego Estrada (born 18 February 1949) is a Mexican politician affiliated with the Institutional Revolutionary Party who served as Governor of Zacatecas between 1986 and 1992 and as Head of the Mexican Social Security Institute during the government of Ernesto Zedillo. He also has served as Senator of the LVIII and LIX Legislatures of the Mexican Congress representing Zacatecas and as Deputy of the LII Legislature.

References

1949 births
Living people
Politicians from Zacatecas City
Governors of Zacatecas
Members of the Senate of the Republic (Mexico)
Members of the Chamber of Deputies (Mexico)
Presidents of the Chamber of Deputies (Mexico)
Institutional Revolutionary Party politicians
21st-century Mexican politicians